Birchs Bay is a rural residential locality in the local government area (LGA) of Kingborough in the Hobart LGA region of Tasmania. The 2016 census recorded a population of 93 for the state suburb of Birchs Bay.

History 
Birchs Bay was gazetted as a locality in 1968.

Geography
The waters of the D'Entrecasteaux Channel form most of the eastern boundary.

Road infrastructure 
Route B68 (Channel Highway) runs through from north-east to south-east.

References

Towns in Tasmania
Localities of Kingborough Council